Coytiera is a genus of leaf beetles in the subfamily Eumolpinae. It is distributed in South America.

Species
Subgenus Coytiera Lefèvre, 1875
 Coytiera aenea Jacoby, 1900
 Coytiera bokermanni Scherer, 1964
 Coytiera dimorpha (Bechyné, 1950)
 Coytiera erythropus (Lefèvre, 1876)
 Coytiera grandis (Bechyné, 1950)
 Coytiera hayekaeana Bechyné, 1955
 Coytiera latefasciata Jacoby, 1899
 Coytiera marginicollis Lefèvre, 1875
 Coytiera nobilitata (Lefèvre, 1884)
 Coytiera strigatipennis Lefèvre, 1885

Subgenus Campylochira Lefèvre, 1876 (Type species: Coytiera pectoralis Lefèvre, 1876)
 Coytiera auropunctata (Lefèvre, 1878)
 Coytiera bipleuralis Bechyné, 1950
 Coytiera egena (Lefèvre, 1884)
 Coytiera erratica (Lefèvre, 1891)
 Coytiera eupulchella Bechyné, 1950
 Coytiera fortepunctata Bechyné, 1950
 Coytiera freyi Bechyné, 1951
 Coytiera fryella Bechyné, 1950
 Coytiera fulvipes Lefèvre, 1876
 Coytiera fulvipes fulvimana (Lefèvre, 1877)
 Coytiera fulvipes fulvipes Lefèvre, 1876
 Coytiera gounellei Lefèvre, 1888
 Coytiera impertinens Bechyné, 1950
 Coytiera laferteana Bechyné, 1950
 Coytiera metallica Lefèvre, 1885
 Coytiera pectoralis Lefèvre, 1876
 Coytiera pertusa (Lefèvre, 1884)
 Coytiera pohli Bechyné, 1954
 Coytiera pygodonta Bechyné, 1950
 Coytiera scintillans Bechyné, 1950
 Coytiera strigosa (Lefèvre, 1878)
 Coytiera subrecta Bechyné, 1950
 Coytiera theobromae Bechyné, 1950
 Coytiera zikani Bechyné, 1950

Synonyms:
 Coytiera costata Jacoby, 1890: moved to Euphrytus
 Coytiera fulvipes Jacoby, 1881: moved to Euphrytus
 Coytiera melancholica (Jacoby, 1881): moved to Freudeita, later moved back to Colaspis
 Coytiera rugipennis Jacoby, 1881: moved to Euphrytus

References

Eumolpinae
Chrysomelidae genera
Beetles of South America
Taxa named by Édouard Lefèvre